Edward Evans or Ted Evans may refer to:
 Edward Evans (divine) (1573–?), English divine
 Edward Evans (poet)  (1716–1798), Welsh poet
 Edward Evans (printseller) (1789–1835), printseller and compositor in London
 Edward Payson Evans (1831–1917), American scholar and linguist
 Edward B. Evans (1846–1922), British philatelist and army officer
 Ted Evans (footballer) (1868–1942), English footballer
 Edward J. Evans (1871–1928), American labor unionist
 Edward Evans, 1st Baron Mountevans (1880–1957), British naval officer and Antarctic explorer
 Edward Evans (politician) (1883–1960), British Labour Party politician
 Edward Lewis Evans (bishop) (1904–1996), Bishop of Barbados
 Edward Gurney Evans (1907–1987), politician in Manitoba, Canada
 Edward Evans (actor) (1914–2001), British actor
 Ted Evans (politician) (1939–1981), Australian politician
 Ted Evans (public servant) (1941–2020), Australian public servant and businessman
 Edward P. Evans (1942–2010), American heir, businessman, investor, horse breeder and philanthropist
 Edward Evans (c. 1948–1965), victim of the Moors murders in England

See also 
 E. E. Evans-Pritchard (1902–1973), British anthropologist